Francisco Agulló y Cebrián (1720s-1780s) was a Spanish nobleman, who held the title of Knight of the Order of Montesa. He also held public offices serving as Alguacil Mayor and Regidor of San Felipe (Xàtiva, Valencia).

Biography 

Agulló was born in Xàtiva, Province of Valencia, Spain, son of Jacinto José Agulló y Guitart and Ángeles Cebrián, belonging to distinguished Valencian families of Aragonese and Catalan roots. He was married to the Marquise Josefa Manuela Sánchez de Bellmont y Cebrián, daughter of Ignacio Sánchez de Bellmont y Luisa Cebrián y Bordas. 

Francisco Agulló y Cebrian held the position of alguacil mayor of the Santa Inquisición de San Felipe, and served as regidor between 1760 and 1795.

References

External links 
euskalnet.net
archivesportaleurope.net

People from Valencia
18th-century Spanish people